The Ontario station is a former train station located in Ontario, Oregon, United States that is listed on the National Register of Historic Places as the Oregon Short Line Railroad Depot. It was constructed in 1907 by the Union Pacific Railroad (UP) for its subsidiary, the Oregon Short Line Railroad (OSL), to replace an 1885 OSL depot that had been located just to the south and had been a simple wood-frame structure. The building is made of concrete block cast to imitate stone, and with red brick trim and other ornamental features. The City of Ontario purchased the building from UP in 1996, but as of 1999 the land remained owned by UP and was being leased to the city.  The station was added to the NRHP in 1999.

During the station's active years, campaigning politicians sometimes made whistle-stops at the station to give speeches, among them being Harry Truman and Richard Nixon.  Senator Robert F. Kennedy passed through just four days before his death.

Amtrak (the National Railroad Passenger Corporation) began service to the station in 1977 with the Pioneer, which originally provided service between Salt Lake City, Utah and Seattle, Washington, but was eventually extended further east and provided daily service from Chicago, Illinois to Seattle. The next eastbound stop on the Pioneer was in Nampa, Idaho and the next westbound station was in Baker City, Oregon.

See also
 National Register of Historic Places listings in Malheur County, Oregon

References

External links

Oregon Short Line Railroad Depot
Railway stations on the National Register of Historic Places in Oregon
Railway stations in the United States opened in 1907
National Register of Historic Places in Malheur County, Oregon
Transportation buildings and structures in Malheur County, Oregon
1907 establishments in Oregon
Former Union Pacific Railroad stations in Oregon
Former Amtrak stations in Oregon
Railway stations closed in 1997
Oregon Short Line Railroad